Kelly Jay Paris (October 17, 1957 – May 27, 2019) was a professional baseball player who played in the Major Leagues with the St. Louis Cardinals, Cincinnati Reds, Baltimore Orioles, and the Chicago White Sox. He played as a third baseman and shortstop.

Career
Paris was born in Encino, California, and attended William Howard Taft High School in Woodland Hills, Los Angeles. While at Taft, he was teammates with future star and hall of fame player Robin Yount, NFL player and head coach Jeff Fisher and NBA referee Bill Spooner.

He was drafted by the St. Louis Cardinals in the second round of the 1975 Major League Baseball Draft on June 3, 1975, and made his major league debut on September 1, 1982 with the Cardinals. On March 31, 1983, Paris was traded to the Cincinnati Reds for Jim Strichek. It was with the Reds that Paris played the majority of his Major League games. In November 1983, the Chicago White Sox purchased his contract from Cincinnati. He was released at the end of spring training and signed a minor league deal with the Pittsburgh Pirates and spent the season with their Triple-A club, the Hawaii Islanders. He then signed with the Baltimore Orioles and later spent time playing in the minor league system of the White Sox and then the Kansas City Royals before finishing his pro career with the Mexico City Reds of the Mexican League.

In 1976, while playing for the Johnson City Cardinals, Kelly and his older brother Bret, achieved what is believed to be a first in professional baseball. The two brothers hit home runs for the same team in the same inning.

He died on May 27, 2019 after a battle with lung cancer.

Return to MLB
After playing with Cincinnati, Paris spent the next part of his career playing for the Rochester Red Wings, the Triple-A team for the Baltimore Orioles at the time. It was during his time with the Reds that Paris developed a drinking problem, which led to him ending up in Baltimore. While in Cincinnati, he checked into rehab, but the stay was brief. He was drinking the night he nearly lost his life in an accident that left him with a bruised sternum, a broken back, and broken ribs. Paris would spend the 1987 season out of baseball, working in a dental lab making dentures for $4.25 an hour. Paris would later sign a contract with the Chicago White Sox, playing in the minors until he was called up in the summer of 1988. In one of his first games back in the big leagues, he hit a homer run to help the White Sox defeat the Angels 6-3. His stay in the big leagues would be brief. He'd play his last major league game on August 30 against the Detroit Tigers and the White Sox released him on November 8, 1988.

References

External links

Kelly Paris at Baseball Almanac
Kelly Paris Stats at Baseball Library
The Baseball Page
Pura Pelota (Venezuelan Winter League)

1957 births
2019 deaths
American expatriate baseball players in Canada
American expatriate baseball players in Mexico
Arkansas Travelers players
Baltimore Orioles players
Baseball players from California
Chicago White Sox players
Cincinnati Reds players
Diablos Rojos del México players
Gastonia Cardinals players
Gulf Coast Cardinals players
Hawaii Islanders players
Indianapolis Indians players
Johnson City Cardinals players
Louisville Redbirds players
Major League Baseball third basemen
Navegantes del Magallanes players
American expatriate baseball players in Venezuela
Omaha Royals players
People from Encino, Los Angeles
Rochester Red Wings players
Springfield Redbirds players
St. Louis Cardinals players
St. Petersburg Cardinals players
Vancouver Canadians players
William Howard Taft Charter High School alumni
Deaths from lung cancer
Deaths from cancer in North Carolina